The Multnomah County Justice Center, or simply Justice Center, is a building located at 1120 Southwest 3rd Avenue in downtown Portland, Oregon. The building was designed by ZGF Architects. It is adjacent to Lownsdale Square.

It houses Portland Police Bureau's Central Precinct on the bottom floors, followed by the Multnomah County Detention Center (one of the two county jails) and PPB's headquarters on the top floors.  It also contains four court rooms of the Multnomah County Circuit Court, used mainly for arraignments. It was partially built with highway funds when Rocky Butte Jail was demolished to make way for Interstate 205.

History
Many of the George Floyd and police brutality protests in Portland have been centered near the building.

References

External links

 Justice Center at Emporis

Government buildings in Portland, Oregon
Southwest Portland, Oregon
Government buildings completed in 1983